Anthony Arlidge, KC (18 February 1937 – 27 January 2023) was a British barrister and judge, known for his role in the Jeremy Bamber trial.

References

1937 births
2023 deaths
20th-century King's Counsel
British King's Counsel
British barristers
British judges